The 17th Legislative Assembly of Saskatchewan was elected in the Saskatchewan general election held in June 1971. The assembly sat from July 28, 1971, to May 13, 1975. The New Democratic Party (NDP) led by Allan Blakeney formed the government. The Liberal Party formed the official opposition. After Ross Thatcher's death in July 1971, David Steuart became party leader in December 1971.

Frederick Arthur Dewhurst served as speaker for the assembly.

Members of the Assembly 
The following members were elected to the assembly in 1971:

Notes:

Party Standings 

Notes:

By-elections 
By-elections were held to replace members for various reasons:

Notes:

References 

Terms of the Saskatchewan Legislature